Irae Simone (born 10 July 1995) is a New Zealand-born, Australian rugby union player who plays for the  in the Super Rugby competition. His position of choice is centre.

Simone made his debut for Australia in October 2020.

References

External links
 

Australian rugby union players
Australia international rugby union players
Australian sportspeople of Samoan descent
Rugby union centres
Sydney (NRC team) players
New South Wales Waratahs players
Canberra Vikings players
ACT Brumbies players
1995 births
Living people
Rugby union players from Auckland
ASM Clermont Auvergne players